Lukits is a surname. Notable people with the surname include:

Eleanor Merriam Lukits (1909–1948), American painter
Theodore Lukits (1897–1992), Romanian-born American painter